Withington Girls' School is a private day school in Fallowfield, Manchester, United Kingdom, providing education for girls between the ages of seven and eighteen. Withington is a member of the Girls' Schools Association and the Headmasters' and Headmistresses' Conference.

The school was founded in 1890 by a number of eminent Mancunians. It was named North West Independent School of the Decade by The Sunday Times in 2021. Withington consistently ranks as one of the top schools in the country for academic results.

History
Withington Girls' School was founded in 1890 by a group of eminent Manchester families who wanted the same educational opportunities for their daughters as were already available for their sons. Among the founders were Mrs Louisa Lejeune, the mother of C. A. Lejeune, C. P. Scott, Henry and Emily Simon, Miss Caroline Herford and Sir Adolphus Ward. There were four pupils in the beginning.

Present day

Over the years, the School has aimed to remain true in essence to the founders' principles.

The school suffered a serious arson attack in August 2003, but took this as an opportunity to build new science labs, and has since built a new sixth form common room and additional classrooms.

School song
"Gaudeamus" is the school song and is sung each year at founders' day, accompanied by the school's orchestra.

Academic curriculum

The following subjects are available for all third form (first year/year seven) pupils:
English and English Literature
Maths
Two of French/German/Spanish
Latin
Chemistry
Biology
Physics
Physical Education
ICT
Food and Nutrition
History
Geography
Religious Studies
Drama and Theatre Studies
Art
Music

As the girls move up the school, other subjects are available, including:
Greek
Classical Civilisation
Computer Science
Politics (Sixth Form only)
Economics (Sixth Form only)
Psychology (Sixth Form only)
Philosophy (Sixth Form only)

Extra-curricular activities

Sport

Trampolinist Sasha Carter represented her country at international trampolining competitions.

Withington won its first national lacrosse title at the 2022 National Schools competition when its U14 team claimed the top position.

Notable former pupils

 Kate Abdo, television presenter
 Julia Britton, playwright
 Sarah Burton, creative director of the Alexander McQueen brand and designer of Catherine Middleton's wedding dress
 Judith Chalmers, television presenter
 Mildred Creak, child psychiatrist
 Marjorie Deane (1914-2008), financial journalist
 Sarah Foot, medieval historian
 Jen Hadfield, poet (Winner of the T.S. Eliot Prize for poetry 2008)
 C. A. Lejeune, film critic
 Brenda Milner, Canadian neuropsychologist
 Joanna Natasegara, 2017 Oscar winner, documentary film-maker 
 Christine Rice, opera singer, mezzo-soprano
 Stephen Whittle, Professor of Equalities Law, campaigner for transgender rights

References

 Girl beats cancer in 2004
 Thanking firemen in June 2004
 Academic success in 2003
 Arson on 22 August 2003

External links
 School website
 Profile on Girls' Schools Association

Girls' schools in Greater Manchester
Private schools in Manchester
Withington

Member schools of the Girls' Schools Association
School buildings in the United Kingdom destroyed by arson
Educational institutions established in 1890
1890 establishments in England